Inaoka (written: 稲岡) is a Japanese surname. Notable people with the surname include:

Ariko Inaoka (born 1975), Japanese photographer
, Japanese high jumper

Japanese-language surnames